Imarhan is an Algerian Tuareg desert rock quintet formed in 2006, in Tamanrasset, Algeria. Their first two albums, Imarhan and Temet, were released on German record label City Slang.

Discography

Studio albums 
 Imarhan (2016)
 Temet (2018)
 Aboogi (2022)

Singles 
 "Tahabort" (2015)
 "Azzaman" (2017)
 "Ehad wa dagh" (2018)

References

External links 
 Bandcamp page

Algerian musical groups
Musical groups established in 2006
City Slang artists
2006 establishments in Angola